Minis is a Jewish surname. It may refer to:

 Abraham Minis (born 1694) (1694–1757), European settler in the colony of Savannah, Georgia
 Philip Minis (1734–1789), American merchant, son of the above
 Isaac Minis (1780–1856), soldier in the War of 1812
 Philip Minis (physician) (1805–1855), American physician
 Abraham Minis (born 1820) (1820–1889), American merchant, son of the above

Jewish surnames